Jack Sanders may refer to:
 Jack Sanders (sledge hockey) (born 1958), American ice sledge hockey player
 Jack Sanders (footballer) (1904–1990), Australian rules footballer
 Jack Sanders (American football) (1917–1991), American football guard